Little Men is a 2016 American drama film directed by Ira Sachs. It had its world premiere at the 2016 Sundance Film Festival and had its European premiere as a cross-section selection in the Generations and Panorama sections at the 66th Berlin International Film Festival.

Plot
After his elderly father dies, Brian Jardine moves his wife Kathy and 13-year-old son Jake into a Brooklyn apartment that they have inherited. The two-story building has a tenant in the ground-level space; a dress shop run by Leonor Calvelli  and her 13-year-old son Tony. Jake and Tony become fast friends despite having very different personalities. Jake is quiet and reserved and spends much of his time sketching or painting, whereas Tony is talkative and gregarious. Tony is an aspiring actor who attends regular classes at Brooklyn's Acting Out! school and dreams of attending Fiorello H. LaGuardia High School to pursue a performing arts education. Jake decides he wants to attend the same school for his painting. The boys bond through everyday activities like skating around the borough, attending a teen rave, and giving their respective parents the silent treatment when disagreements occur. Tony even starts a fight with his classmates when they insult Jake's sexuality.

The Jardines discover that Brian's father has been charging Leonor an unusually small rent on her store. Since Brian's acting career is stagnant and the family is almost entirely supported by Kathy's work as a psychotherapist, they inform Leonor that her rent will need to be tripled, still placing it below market value for the changing neighborhood. Leonor makes emotional appeals to Brian, claiming that she and his father were close friends and that he would want Brian to be generous to her. Brian is reluctant to take direct legal action against Leonor, partly because he's simply glad his introverted son has finally made a friend. After receiving an ultimatum from his sister Audrey, he formally evicts Leonor and her son.

Jake is devastated and tearfully pleads Tony's case, but is made to face reality. Brian encourages Jake to return his focus to his art and his upcoming application to LaGuardia. Some time later, Jake accompanies a group of fellow art students on a museum visit and is surprised to see Tony and some of his classmates on a tour. Jake watches from across a large atrium as Tony walks away, then quietly rejoins his own group to work on another sketch.

Cast
 Greg Kinnear as Brian Jardine
 Paulina García as Leonor Calvelli
 Jennifer Ehle as Kathy Jardine
 Theo Taplitz as Jake Jardine
 Michael Barbieri as Tony Calvelli
 Talia Balsam as Audrey
 Alfred Molina as Hernán
 Clare Foley as Sally

Reception

Critical response
On the review aggregator Rotten Tomatoes, the film has an approval rating of 96% based on 137 reviews and an average rating of 8/10. The website's critical consensus reads, "Little Men takes a compassionate look at the ways in which adult problems impact childhood friendships — and offers another affecting New York drama from director Ira Sachs." On another aggregator, Metacritic, the film has a score of 86 out of 100 based on 37 critics, indicating "universal acclaim".

Awards and nominations

References

External links
 
 
 
 Official screenplay

2016 films
2016 drama films
American drama films
Greek drama films
English-language Greek films
Films about families
Films directed by Ira Sachs
Films set in Brooklyn
Films shot in New York City
2016 independent films
2010s English-language films
2010s American films